The French basketball league system is a series of interconnected competitions for professional basketball clubs in France. The system has a hierarchical format with a promotion and relegation system between competitions at different levels. Some of the competitions are: the LNB Pro A, LNB Pro B, Nationale Masculine 1 (NM1), the Nationale Masculine 2 (NM2), the Nationale Masculine 3 (NM3), and the LNB Espoirs.

The competitions

Other competitions
French Cup
French Leaders Cup
Match des Champions

See also
League system
European professional club basketball system
Spanish basketball league system
Greek basketball league system
Italian basketball league system
Russian basketball league system
Turkish basketball league system
German basketball league system
Serbian basketball league system
Polish basketball league system
Hungarian basketball league system
South American professional club basketball system

References

External links
Ligue Nationale de Basket Official Site 
Eurobasket.com French Basketball (Men) Page

Basketball league systems